The Zimbabwe cricket team toured Ireland in August and September 2021 to play three One Day International (ODI) and five Twenty20 International (T20I) matches. The ODI series formed part of the inaugural 2020–2023 ICC Cricket World Cup Super League. Cricket Ireland confirmed the fixtures in February 2021. Originally, three T20I matches were scheduled to be played, but two more T20I matches were added in April 2021, after planned matches against Pakistan were cancelled.

However, on 22 July 2021, Cricket Ireland announced that the series would need to be rescheduled due to quarantine requirements needed for the visiting team. The aim was to reschedule the matches for August-September 2021. Zimbabwe Cricket requested government clearance to travel to Ireland, with 19 August 2021 proposed as the date to depart for the tour. On 5 August 2021, Cricket Ireland confirmed the new itinerary for the tour, with the series starting on 27 August 2021.

Zimbabwe won the first T20I match by three runs. However, Ireland went on to win the next three matches, winning the series with a match to spare. Zimbabwe won the fifth T20I match by five runs, with Ireland winning the series 3–2.

Zimbabwe won the first ODI by 38 runs. In the second ODI, Ireland scored 282/8 before the match was washed out, ending in a no result. The day before the third ODI of the series, Zimbabwe's Brendan Taylor announced that he would retire from international cricket following the match. Ireland went on to win the match by seven wickets, with the series drawn 1–1.

Squads

Zimbabwe did not name individual squads for the ODI and T20I matches, opting instead to name a combined squad of 18 players for the tour. Curtis Campher was ruled out of Ireland's ODI squad after suffering an injury in the first T20I match. Shane Getkate was named as Campher's replacement for Ireland's ODI matches.

Tour match

T20I series

1st T20I

2nd T20I

3rd T20I

4th T20I

5th T20I

ODI series

1st ODI

2nd ODI

3rd ODI

References

External links
 Series home at ESPN Cricinfo

2021 in Irish cricket
2021 in Zimbabwean cricket
International cricket competitions in 2021
Zimbabwean cricket tours of Ireland
Cricket events postponed due to the COVID-19 pandemic